
Gmina Laszki is a rural gmina (administrative district) in Jarosław County, Subcarpathian Voivodeship, in south-eastern Poland.

Villages
Gmina Laszki contains the villages and settlements of Bobrówka, Bukowina, Charytany, Czerniawka, Korzenica, Laszki, Miękisz Nowy, Miękisz Stary, Tuchla, Tuchla-Osada, Wietlin, Wietlin Pierwszy, Wietlin Trzeci, Wietlin-Osada and Wysocko.

Neighbouring gminas
Gmina Laszki is bordered by the gminas of Jarosław, Oleszyce, Radymno, Wiązownica and Wielkie Oczy.

References

Polish official population figures 2006

Laszki
Jarosław County